Tiger cub refers to the infant of the feline Panthera tigris; for other uses, with full capitalization, see:

Tiger Cub Developments Sherwood Ranger an aircraft manufactured by a small-scale British aircraft manufacturer/producer
Tiger Cub Economies, a collective term for the five major economies of South-East Asia
Tiger Cub (Night Watch), a character in the Night Watch series of Russian novels
Tiger Cubs, the junior section of the Boy Scouts of America
Tiger Cubs (finance), a group of former Tiger Management employees who have since founded their own Hedge Funds
Tiger Cubs (TV series), a 2012 Hong Kong police procedural series  /TC II sequel
Triumph Tiger Cub, a British motorcycle from 1950s until late 1960s